Kim Chang-ho (born 15 September 1969, died 11 October 2018), was a South Korean mountaineer, and at the time of his death in 2018, was considered to be Korea's most prolific alpine and Himalayan climber.  

In 2012, Kim won the Piolet d'Or "Asia award" with An Chi-young when they made the first-ever ascent of Himjung (7,092m, 2012) in Nepal via its southwest face. In 2017, Kim and his two climbing partners were awarded an Honourable Mention for the 2017 Piolet d'Or for their ascent of Gangapurna's south face (7,455m, 2016) in a "bold lightweight alpine style", the first Koreans to receive such a citation.

In 2013, he became the first Korean to climb all of the world's 14 eight-thousanders without using supplementary oxygen; in doing so he set a record for completing the feat in the shortest time at 7 years, 10 months and 6 days.  He was killed on 11 October 2018, alongside several other fellow South Korean climbers and local mountain guides, in Nepal when a snowstorm destroyed their 3,500m-altitude base camp beneath Gurja Himal in the Dhaulagiri.

Early life and education 
Kim Chang-ho was born in the rural town of Yecheon-gun near the center of South Korea on 15 September 1969.  Kim performed well in his intramural handball team in his elementary school, playing at the province-level sports festival.

In 1988, he entered the University of Seoul (UOS) with a major in International Trade, however, his participation in regular international climbing expeditions meant that he did not graduate until 2013.  Kim said that he decided that in order to complete his undergraduate degree that he needed to learn more in humanities for the sake of climbing.  Due to the curriculum change, his bachelor's degree was not International Trade but Business Administration.

Mountaineering career

University Alpine Club (1988–2000) 
Once Kim joined the UOS Alpine Club, he significantly increased his climbing and mountaineering activities.  By the 1990s, Kim was rock climbing routes graded 5.12, and participated in two Karakoram expeditions organized by UOS Alpine Club: Great Trango (6,286m, 1993) and Gasherbrum IV (7,925m, 1996). In both expeditions, Kim was one of the lead climbers, creating a reputation of a bold and even reckless approach to climbing. For example, on a new route on the east face of Gasherbrum IV, Kim and his partner reached 7,450m.  Facing the impasse of a rocky face with no cracks to secure protection, Kim told his partner: "Let the rope go if I got a fall!".  Kim referred to this and other moments in the 90's as "my immature younger years when I pursued only great achievements on mountains".

Pakistan exploration (2000–2004) 
Kim came to international climbing attention in 2000 when he undertook a solo exploration of the Karakoram.  From 2000 to 2004, Kim surveyed mountain ranges across the Karakoram, the Hindu Kush, and the Pamir Mountains in northern Pakistan. He walked many mid-to-large-sized glaciers, crossed numerous passes, investigated and took photos of known or unknown peaks which he judged noteworthy for climbing.  In several cases, he was first to step on the deepest side of remote glaciers, or was only second to the 19th century Western explorers.  He collected local names of the peaks, passes, and glaciers, and meticulously compared them with those in several different maps of the regions.  Kim published his findings and experiences in the Seoul-based Monthly Magazine Mountain and shared his knowledge of unclimbed peaks,  leading to the first ascent of Amphu I (6,740m) in the Mahalangur Himal by three Korean mountaineers.

An example of Kim's attention to detail was shown in 2003, when he had to name two 6,000 metre peaks for which he made the first ascent in the Chiantar valley, Hindu Raj. The first peak is labeled in Tsuneo Miyamori's 2001 map as "Suj Sar SW", pairing with a nearby 6,177m-peak named "Suj Sar NE".  Kim identified that the two peaks were completely separate.  Kim also observed that while "Sar" means peak in the Wakhi language, the Shina language was the local vernacular language where a distinct peak is called a "Kor". Since each peak was located closely to Atar Sar and to Haiz Gah, Kim and an informed villager came up with new names: "Atar Kor" (6,189m) and "Haiz Kor" (6,105m).

His notes included books, journals, rolls of films, and a digital database of 2.4 terabytes.  Kim's climbing partner and biographer, Young-Hoon Oh, argues, "As far as I know, in the mountain ranges in northern Pakistan no one has ever ventured a geographic exploration in such a massive scale and in such a meticulous manner, nor anyone or any institution has accumulated mountaineering geographic information of the area in such comprehensiveness and detail."  Even at the time of his death, Kim was known to have kept a detailed plan of new climbing routes in the region for the next five years.

The ordeal of his Pakistan exploration fundamentally transformed his attitude toward mountaineering in a way that appreciates relationships with the other.  The trips were beyond arduous: he fell into a crevasse numerously, his ankle sprained, the jeep overturned, starved many days, suffered from desolation and hallucination, bandit-attacked and murder-threatened.  It was herders, farmers, housewives, village children who came first to give him a helping hand. Realizing how egocentric he was to mountains Kim learned about the importance of relationship and appreciation and gradually began to consider obtaining and harmonizing with local knowledge and wisdom an integral part of mountaineering in remote places.

High altitude climbs (2005–2018) 

In 2005, after ninety days of exhaustive and dangerous climbing in siege tactics on the Nanga Parbat's sheer Rupal face, Kim stood on the top with late Lee Hyun-jo (who perished on Everest southwest face in 2007).  Through the radio, Lee sobbed with one of his close friends at the basecamp, saying, “Bro!  It should’ve been much better if you’re here together …”  This struck Kim.  Trudging toward the basecamp after descent, Kim reflected upon his own egocentrism in the context of expedition, noting, “What I’ve just climbed was an imaginary Nanga.  This mountain is full of selfish desire.  What could then be the true Nanga to me? … Standing on the summit gives no pleasure nor any meaning whatsoever when lacking this: the true Nanga begets only when I return alive with my teammate.”

He then began to climb the fourteen thousanders.  The still young and relatively unheard-of Kim shined to the eyes of Hong Bo-Sung, the leader of Busan Alpine Federation's fourteen-peak project.  Under the leadership of Hong—a studious leader and a person of understanding—combined with Kim's skills and experience on high mountains, Busan Dynamic Hope Expedition excelled on 8000m peaks.  Highly pragmatic in their approach, the expedition consisted of a small team of three to four, barely relying on external support such as Sherpas and oxygen tanks. The whole project was completed in mere five years and four months (2006-2011).

Kim is most well-known for completing all fourteen eight-thousanders in from 2006 to 2013, and without the use of bottled oxygen, and in the shortest-ever period of 7 years and 10 months (Nirmal Purja broke Kim's speed record in October 2019, but used bottled oxygen).  

Kim also climbed formidable new routes and first ascents in the Himalayas and the Karakoram.  Peaks and faces on which Kim opened a new route included Pakistan's Shikari (5,928m, 2001) in the Yasin valley, Khache Brangsa (5,560m, 2001) in the Arandu valley, a new route on Nanga Parbat's Rupal face (8,125m, 2005), Nepal's Gangapurna's south face (7,455m, 2016), Gangapurna West's south face (7,140m, 2016), and Papsura's south face (6,451m, 2017) in India.  For his part in the ascent of Gangapurna, Kim and his two colleagues earned one of the two Honourable Mentions bestowed in the 2017 Piolet d'Or awards for major ascents - the first-ever for a Korean.

The list of his first ascents included: partnered ascents in Batura II (7,762m) in Pakistan and Himjung (7,140m) in Nepal, both with partner(s), as well as solo ascents in Pakistan of an unnamed peak (6,006m) near the Lupgarsar pass, Delhi Sang-i-sar (6,225m) in the Chapursan valley, Atar Kor (6,189m), Haiz Kor (6,105m) in the Chiantar range, and Bakma Brakk (6,150m, or Bukma peak).

Death (2018) 
In 2018, Kim planned to climb Gurja Himal's untouched 3,800m-long south face in the alpine style.  This climb was part of what he called the "Korean Way Project", an unconfined series of Himalayan climbs he embarked from 2016.  The project aimed to climb a new route on a mountain, with no external assistance.  Interestingly, Kim specified the following three criteria in the choice of climbing destination: the potential merit of exploration in the entire travel, the mountain's significance in the local culture, and the planned route's naturalness.  This stylistic, innovative approach to mountaineering stems from his own mountaineering philosophy that distinctively concerns the ethics of relationship, or what he called “mountaineering of coexistence".

The bodies of Kim's team were found scattered around the cliffs below their Gurja Himal base camp as far as 500m away.  Many have inferred the cause of the accident to be the blast of an avalanche that occurred while everyone slept.  The Google Earth image shows a massive serac at the edge of the upper plateau on 5,900 m to the west of Gurja Himal's summit. It is hypothesized that the serac broke off and swept the base camp straight down the wall. It is inferred that the accident occurred between the evening of October 10 and the morning of 11, based on the fact that the journal of meticulous Kim Chang-Ho ended on October 10.

See also
Nirmal Purja, world speed record holder for 14 eight-thousander ascents (with use of supplementary oxygen)

Notes

References 

1969 births
2018 deaths
South Korean mountain climbers
Summiters of all 14 eight-thousanders
South Korean summiters of Mount Everest
Mountaineering deaths
University of Seoul alumni
Piolet d'Or winners